The Croatian Romani Union "Kali Sara" is an organization of the Romani people in Croatia. Its seat is located in Croatian capital city of Zagreb. The organization was established in July 2007 and its first president was Veljko Kajtazi, future member of the Croatian Parliament. On the occasion of publication of the first Romani-Croatian dictionary in 2008, the Alliance initiated the signing of the Charter of the Romani Language which was signed by 157 individuals. On the date of the publication of the dictionary on November 5 (authored by the Alliance's president), the local and international Roma community celebrated the World Day of Romani Language. The Croatian Parliament formally recognized Romani Language Day on May 25, 2012. In 2015 UNESCO accepted the alliance's initiative to recognize the Romani language as a part of global cultural heritage by recognizing the World Day of Romani Language. The formal proposal to UNESCO was made by the Republic of Croatia. In 2018, the Alliance published the monograph "Kali Sara - The First Ten Years".

See also
Minority languages of Croatia
Rights of the Roma in the European Union

References 

Romani in Croatia
Human rights organizations based in Croatia
2007 establishments in Croatia
Organizations based in Zagreb
Romani rights